Sheila Foster Anthony is an American attorney and former government official. From 1997 to 2002, Anthony served as a member of the Federal Trade Commission (FTC) from 1997 to 2002.

Early life and education 
Anthony is a native of Hope, Arkansas. She is the sister of Vince Foster, who served as deputy White House counsel from January to July 1993. Anthony received her undergraduate education at the University of Arkansas, graduating in 1962. Anthony went on to receive her degree in law from Washington College of Law at American University.

Early career 
Prior to entering government, Anthony practiced law at Dow, Lohnes & Albertson in Washington, D.C., where she specialized in intellectual property (IP) law. From 1993 to 1995, Anthony served as Assistant Attorney General for Legislative Affairs.

Federal Trade Commission (FTC) 
In 1997, President Bill Clinton nominated her to replace Janet Steiger on the FTC. Upon her nomination to the FTC in 1997, she was described as an "unknown but politically connected intellectual property attorney" who would likely support the agency's then-ongoing scrutiny of online service company AOL. In the run-up to the FTC vote on the then-proposed AOL and Time Warner, Anthony was seen as a key swing vote. 

She was replaced as a member of the FTC by Pamela Jones Harbour in 2003.

Post-FTC career 
In 2016, she wrote an op-ed for the Washington Post criticizing Donald Trump over comments made about her brother.

Personal life 
Anthony is married to Beryl Anthony Jr., a former Democratic member of the House of Representatives from Arkansas, with whom she has two children.

References 

Antitrust lawyers
Federal Trade Commission personnel
University of Arkansas alumni
Washington College of Law alumni
Living people
Year of birth missing (living people)
Place of birth missing (living people)

American University alumni